Bergeranthus is a genus of flowering plants belonging to the family Aizoaceae.

Its native range is South African Republic.

Species:

Bergeranthus albomarginatus 
Bergeranthus concavus 
Bergeranthus longisepalus 
Bergeranthus multiceps 
Bergeranthus nanus 
Bergeranthus scapiger 
Bergeranthus vespertinus

References

Aizoaceae
Aizoaceae genera